The Quebec Championship was a professional golf tournament on the Champions Tour, a professional tour for golfers 50 and older operated by the PGA Tour. A 54-hole event, it debuted in 2010 as the Montreal Championship at the Club de Golf Fontainebleau in the Montreal suburb of Blainville, Quebec, Canada. The course was a par-72 at 

For 2012, the tournament moved a week earlier in the schedule and relocated to the Vercheres course at La Vallee du Richelieu Golf Club in Sainte-Julie, Quebec. The tournament remained at La Vallee du Richelieu in 2013, but changed its date to September and switched to the Rouville course.

The 2013 edition was the last in the Montreal area. The event moved to the Quebec City area for 2014, and is now held at Golf La Tempête in Lévis. The 2014 edition is the first PGA Tour-sanctioned event held in the Quebec City area since the 1956 Labatt Open.

Winners

Notes

References

External links

Coverage on Champions Tour official site
valleedurichelieu.com 

Former PGA Tour Champions events
Golf tournaments in Quebec
Sport in Montreal
Sport in Quebec City
Defunct sports competitions in Canada
Sainte-Julie, Quebec
Lévis, Quebec
Recurring sporting events established in 2010
Recurring sporting events disestablished in 2015
2010 establishments in Quebec
2015 disestablishments in Quebec